is a former Brazilian Japanese football player who moved to Japan at age 16 to complete his high school studies and obtained his Japanese citizenship in 1995. His son Maito Santos is also former footballer.

Playing career
Santos was born in Bahia, Brazil on March 28, 1968. In May 1985, he moved to Japan and entered high school in Japan. After graduating from high school, he joined Japan Soccer League club Yamaha Motors in 1987. He played in 30 matches as offensive midfielder. In 1992, he moved to new J1 League club Shimizu S-Pulse. However he could hardly play in the games due to restrictions on foreign players. In September 1995, he obtained his Japanese citizenship. However he could hardly play in the games due to injuries. He retired at the end of the 1996 season.

Club statistics

References

External links

1968 births
Living people
Japanese footballers
Japan Soccer League players
J1 League players
Júbilo Iwata players
Shimizu S-Pulse players
Brazilian emigrants to Japan
Naturalized citizens of Japan
Clube Atlético Juventus players
Association football midfielders